Matthew Grevers (born March 26, 1985) is an American competition swimmer who competes in the backstroke and freestyle events, and is a six-time Olympic medalist.  He has won a total of thirty-three medals in major international competition, fourteen gold, twelve silver, and seven bronze spanning the Olympics, World Championships, and the Universiade.  At the 2008 Summer Olympics, Grevers won gold medals as a member of the U.S. teams in the 4×100-meter freestyle and 4×100-meter medley relays, and a silver medal in the 100-meter backstroke.  Four years later, at the 2012 Summer Olympics, he won gold medals in the 100-meter backstroke and the 4×100-meter medley relay, and a silver medal in the 4×100-meter freestyle relay.

Swimming career
At the 2008 Summer Olympics in Beijing, China, Grevers won two gold medals by swimming in the preliminary heats of the 4×100-meter freestyle relay and 4×100-meter medley relay (swimming the backstroke leg) as the Americans went on to win the finals in those events and medals are awarded to participants at any step along the way.  Grevers also won an individual silver medal in the 100-meter backstroke in a time of 53.11-second, 0.57 of a second behind the winner, world record holder Aaron Peirsol.

At the 2009 World Aquatics Championships, Grevers was part of U.S. men's 4×100-meter freestyle relay team who took the gold ahead of Russia and France. Grevers also earned a gold in the 4×100-meter medley relay for his contributions in the heats.

2012 Summer Olympics

At the 2012 United States Olympic Trials, the qualifying meet for the 2012 Olympics, Grevers qualified for the U.S. Olympic team by finishing first in the 100-meter backstroke and third in the 100-meter freestyle.  In the final of the 100-meter backstroke, Grevers recorded the fastest time in a textile suit and won in a time of 52.08 seconds, then the second-best effort of all time and just behind Aaron Peirsol's world record of 51.94. In the 100-meter freestyle, Grevers placed third with a time of 48.55, which ensured him a spot on the 4×100-meter freestyle relay. Grevers also competed in the 50-meter freestyle, and placed sixth in the final with a time of 22.09.

At the 2012 Summer Olympics in London, Grevers won a total of three medals: two golds and one silver.  Grevers earned his first medal, a silver, by swimming for the second-place U.S. team in the preliminary heats of the 4×100-meter freestyle relay.  In the final, the American team finished second behind France.  Teaming with Jimmy Feigen, Ricky Berens, and Jason Lezak in the heats, Grevers swam the second leg and recorded a time of 47.59.  After leading the heats (52.92) and semi-finals (52.66) of the 100-meter backstroke, Grevers won gold in the final of the 100-meter backstroke with a time of 52.16, bettering Aaron Peirsol's Olympic record of 52.54 set in 2008 and 0.76 seconds ahead of Nick Thoman.  For Grevers, it was his first individual gold medal. In his final event, the 4×100-meter medley relay, Grevers won gold with Brendan Hansen, Michael Phelps and Nathan Adrian.  Swimming the backstroke leg, Grevers recorded a time of 52.58 seconds, and the U.S. team went on to win with a time of 3:29.35.

2013 World Championships

At the 2013 FINA World Championships in Barcelona, Grevers achieved a total of two medals: a gold and a silver. On the first night of swimming, Grevers missed the top-eight championship finals roster in the 50-meter butterfly, as he finished his semi-final run with a twelfth-place time in 23.35. The following day, Grevers threw down the event's fastest time of 52.93 to claim the gold medal in the 100 m backstroke, finishing ahead of his teammate David Plummer by nearly two-tenths of a second. On the final night of the meet, Grevers swam his last two finals with only 45 minutes in between. First, he posted a matching time of 24.54 to share the silver medal with France's Jérémy Stravius in the 50 m backstroke. Nearly an hour later, Grevers teamed up with Kevin Cordes, Ryan Lochte, and Nathan Adrian for the final in the 4 × 100 m medley relay. During the race, Grevers swam the backstroke leg and touched the wall with a split of 53.02 until his teammate Cordes left the block 0.04 seconds early on the breaststroke leg, smashing the medal chances entirely for the Americans with a disastrous disqualification.

He did not make the 2016 Olympics Team as he finished third in the 100m backstroke.

2017 World Championships

At the 2017 US National Championships, the qualifying meet for the 2017 World Championships in swimming, Grevers won the 100-meter backstroke, ahead of the 2016 Olympic champion and 100-meter backstroke world record holder, Ryan Murphy, to qualify the World Championships later that year in Budapest.

At the 2017 World Aquatics Championships in Budapest, Grevers placed second behind Xu Jiayu of China but ahead of Murphy in the 100-meter backstroke. He also earned gold medals by swimming in the heats and finals of the US 4x100-meter medley and mixed medley relays, as well as a bronze medal in the non-Olympic 50-meter backstroke. The mixed medley relay had also set a World and Championship record time of 3:38.56 in the finals.

Personal life
Grevers was born in Lake Forest, Illinois. With his Siblings Carolyn and Andrew Grevers, He graduated from Lake Forest High School in 2003, and then attended Northwestern University in Evanston, Illinois, and swam for the Northwestern Wildcats swimming and diving team.

Both of Grevers's parents are from the Netherlands.  Grevers considered representing the Netherlands and even spoke about it with Dutch swimming legend Pieter van den Hoogenband.  Ultimately, he decided to represent the United States.

Grevers proposed to his wife, Annie Chandler, at the Missouri Grand Prix on Saturday February 11, 2012.  The couple were married on April 6, 2013 in San Antonio, Texas.

Annie gave birth to the couple's first child, a daughter, named Skylar Lea Grevers on November 9, 2016. Grevers and his family reside in Tucson, Arizona.

Grevers announcing the birth of his second child with Annie, made Swimming World Biweekly as one of two family lifestyle articles printed, the other being the engagement of Caeleb Dressel to Meghan Dressel. In December 2019, they had their second daughter together, named Barbara Grace.

See also

List of multiple Olympic gold medalists
List of Northwestern University alumni
List of Olympic medalists in swimming (men)
List of United States records in swimming
List of World Aquatics Championships medalists in swimming (men)
World record progression 4 × 100 metres freestyle relay

References

External links
 
 
 
 
 
 

1985 births
Living people
American male backstroke swimmers
American male freestyle swimmers
American people of Dutch descent
Medalists at the FINA World Swimming Championships (25 m)
Medalists at the 2012 Summer Olympics
Medalists at the 2008 Summer Olympics
Northwestern Wildcats men's swimmers
Olympic gold medalists for the United States in swimming
Olympic silver medalists for the United States in swimming
Sportspeople from Lake Forest, Illinois
Swimmers at the 2008 Summer Olympics
Swimmers at the 2012 Summer Olympics
World Aquatics Championships medalists in swimming
World record holders in swimming
Universiade medalists in swimming
Lake Forest High School (Illinois) alumni
Universiade gold medalists for the United States
Universiade silver medalists for the United States
Universiade bronze medalists for the United States
Medalists at the 2005 Summer Universiade
Medalists at the 2007 Summer Universiade